The 2020 XFL season was the first season in the reboot of the XFL, and the second in the history of the XFL brand created and owned by professional wrestling magnate Vince McMahon, coming 19 years after the 2001 XFL season.

The season began on February 8, 2020, with the DC Defenders hosting and defeating the Seattle Dragons. The league planned to have a ten-week regular season through April 12, with division championships April 18 and 19, with the XFL Championship scheduled for April 26 in Houston.

In March 2020, amid the COVID-19 pandemic in the United States, the XFL announced that the league would be cancelling the rest of the season, ahead of the league's suspension of operations and bankruptcy filing a month later.

Background
In the 2017 ESPN 30 for 30 documentary This Was the XFL, McMahon openly mused about reviving the XFL, noting that changes would need to be made compared to 2001 in order to make it viable and relevant in the modern era. McMahon had purchased the trademarks of the defunct United Football League and an alternative brand, "UrFL" (Your Football League), in early 2017. The following year, the director of the documentary, Charlie Ebersol (son of Dick Ebersol), would go on to help form the Alliance of American Football (AAF) in 2018, hoping to beat the revived XFL in being the first to play (they did by a year).<ref name=xfl_competitor>Eight-Team XFL Competitor Plans to Launch in February 2019, Dan Gartland, Sports Illustrated, March 20, 2018</ref> While the league was able to launch in 2019, a year before the XFL's first season, it went bankrupt before its first season finished after it twice lost its major investors. On December 15, 2017, Bleacher Report columnist Brad Shepard reported that McMahon was seriously considering a revival of the XFL, with an expected announcement on January 25, 2018. In a statement to Deadspin, WWE did not confirm or deny the rumors, but did state that McMahon was establishing a new company known as Alpha Entertainment, which would "explore investment opportunities across the sports and entertainment landscapes, including professional football." On December 21, 2017, WWE issued a filing to the Securities and Exchange Commission, stating that McMahon had sold $100 million worth of WWE stock to fund Alpha Entertainment. Alpha Entertainment is headquartered next door to WWE headquarters in Stamford, Connecticut.

On January 25, 2018, Alpha Entertainment announced a new incarnation of the XFL, which would begin with a 10-week inaugural season beginning in January or February 2020. In a press conference, McMahon stated that the new XFL would be dissimilar to its previous incarnation, stating that "There's only so many things that have 'FL' on the end of them and those are already taken. But we aren't going to have much of what the original XFL had." McMahon stated that the league would feature eight teams as a single entity owned by Alpha (the previous XFL was also a single-entity league), which had been revealed in 2019. Alpha Entertainment was established in order to keep the league's management and operations separate from that of WWE. McMahon is prepared to invest as much as $500 million, five times as much as his investment in the 2001 XFL. The XFL's decision to nix cheerleaders is in part due to changing attitudes regarding women's participation in entertaining sports fans. He liquidated an additional $270 million in WWE stock (representing a 4% stake in WWE) in March 2019 to provide additional funding for the league.

McMahon stated that he wanted to play in existing NFL markets but did not identify potential cities specifically and did not rule out any specific cities. McMahon also did not rule out playing on artificial turf. The original XFL avoided artificial playing surfaces (as most such surfaces then were more carpet-like); however, the technology has advanced considerably since 2001, with modern artificial turfs mimicking real grass more closely. John Shumway from KDKA-TV in Pittsburgh and local media from Orlando and San Diego both inquired about potential teams in their respective cities, but McMahon (while stating that "I love Pittsburgh") declined to name any cities for teams. McMahon also stated that teams would have new identities compared to recycling old identities from the old league. The league sent solicitations to thirty metropolitan areas as potential locations for a team.

Teams
As with the 2001 XFL, the 2020 XFL operated eight teams, all centrally owned by the league's holding company, Alpha Entertainment LLC, as a single entity. Alpha Entertainment was spun off from WWE to keep the league's finances separate from the publicly traded professional wrestling enterprise, with McMahon the sole proprietor.

The emergence of the Alliance of American Football created issues selecting cities to host XFL teams, as many potential candidates became home to AAF teams (notably Orlando, the next largest city without an NFL team and an acceptable stadium. Orlando was also one of the original XFL's most successful markets and second in attendance for the 2019 AAF season). Not wanting teams to compete against other spring football teams in the same market, the XFL chose different cities than the AAF.

Commissioner Oliver Luck announced the eight host cities and stadiums for the first franchises on December 5, 2018, and also announced the starting date of February 8, 2020, the weekend after Super Bowl LIV, as the league chose to focus on placing teams in large media markets, selecting five of the top seven largest media markets in the U.S.; based on 2017 census bureau estimates, all eight XFL markets have over 2.9 million residents each (the smallest being St. Louis). This was seen as a stark contrast to the other emerging spring football league, the Alliance of American Football, which primarily chose markets without NFL teams, seen as a decision to avoid competing with existing fan bases; three of the AAF's markets (Birmingham, Memphis, and Salt Lake, the first two of which had teams in the first XFL) had populations less than half that of St. Louis's. The only XFL market which does not currently host an NFL team is St. Louis, which in 2015 saw its NFL team (the Rams) return to Los Angeles.

Two of the original league's metropolitan areas also received teams in the revival: New York and Los Angeles. All eight teams received new brandings on August 21, 2019: the New York Guardians, DC Defenders, Tampa Bay Vipers, St. Louis BattleHawks, Dallas Renegades, Houston Roughnecks, Seattle Dragons, and Los Angeles Wildcats.

Names and logos for the XFL teams were to be revealed in early June but were delayed over two months from that date. The XFL filed trademarks for five potential team names for its Seattle-based franchise in late June, including one for the eventually chosen name Seattle Dragons, but not for any of the other seven teams. The names, logos and colors for all eight teams were revealed on August 21, 2019, in a livestreamed special. The 2020 XFL Draft was held on October 15 and 16, 2019. Training camps began in November.

Besides the eight competitive teams, the XFL had operated a centralized practice squad and farm team, which operated as a full team with a coaching staff and a 40-man roster (encompassing offensive and defensive players but no special teams) but didn't play any on-the-record games against the other eight teams. The team shared practice facilities with the Dallas Renegades and was internally known as "Team 9". Team 9 replenished itself after Week 5 when the team's members were assigned to rosters when it expanded to 57 players each; but the season ended abruptly.

Full stadium capacity. The large stadiums with multiple decks only open the lower bowl for XFL games, similar to the former AAF games and MLS matches played in large stadiums. The XFL has a target stadium size of 30,000 seats, so that in the event of playoff games, the upper decks can be opened to increase capacity.

Team 9
Team 9 was a specialized team that acts as a hybrid farm team and practice squad for the league, and was inspired by a similar scheme employed by NFL Europe. It holds a maximum of 40 players at a time and is meant to prepare players for call up to one of the XFL's 8 teams to fill roster vacancies due to injuries of other players or if the teams see a player as a "hidden gem". The team shares practice facilities and support staff with the Dallas Renegades but maintains its own coaching staff; its head coach is Bart Andrus and is assisted by Pete Kuharchek and Peter Vaas.

During the first two weeks of the season, teams are encouraged to use players from Team 9 to fill roster spots, but are not required to do so, as they may prefer to sign a player unaffiliated with the XFL or re-sign a player who participated in their preseason camps but was cut. After Week 2, exclusively using Team 9 players to fill rosters will become a requirement, with Team 9 constantly replenishing itself by adding new players from outside the XFL.

On March 10, each team's maximum roster size increased from 52 to 57 players and the majority of Team 9 was dispersed. Team 9 was to reload to approximately 36 players. Team 9 does not include the specialist positions of kicker, punter, or long snapper, who are instead reserved in a separate "player pool."

Players and coaches
Each XFL team has 52 players regular-season roster, far more than the 38 in the original XFL and comparable to the size of the 53-man NFL rosters; 46 of those 52 are active on any given game day.

XFL does not have the same eligibility requirements for players as the NFL. Currently the NFL requires all players to be at least 3 years removed from high school to be eligible for a team's roster. Almost all prospects then participate in NCAA football for the 3-year waiting period. This eligibility requirement is an agreement between the NCAA and the NFL. The NFL, in exchange for not signing young players who would ordinarily play in the NCAA, is allowed nearly unlimited access to scout and recruit college players. With the XFL not using the same set of requirements for players, there is the possibility the league will sign players who are less than 3 years out of high school. The XFL has also not ruled out signing players who play college football in 2019, something the NFL has not done since 1925, which (former commissioner) Luck said will be considered on a case-by-case basis; In the league's inaugural season, safety Kenny Robinson, who had run into eligibility issues that led to him being expelled from college, chose to play in the XFL instead of transferring to another college; Robinson was a success in the XFL and was ultimately selected in the 2020 NFL Draft.

The first head coach and general manager, Dallas's Bob Stoops, was announced February 7, 2019, with the coaches for Seattle (Jim Zorn), Washington (Pep Hamilton), and Tampa Bay (Marc Trestman) following later in the month. Kevin Gilbride named New York's head coach/general manager on April 16, while Jonathan Hayes was announced as the head coach and general manager of the St. Louis franchise two days later. Winston Moss was announced as Los Angeles's head coach on May 7.  The last of the inaugural head coaches, Houston's June Jones, was hired May 13 and introduced May 20.

Draft

The 2020 XFL Draft was held October 15 and 16, 2019, via conference call. Seventy-one players were allocated to each team in separate position drafts: one marquee quarterback allocated by the league to each team, ten skill positions, ten offensive linemen, ten defensive linemen and/or linebackers, ten defensive backs, and thirty players of any position. Due to the structure of the draft, there was no true first overall selection. A supplemental draft was held in late November.

Compensation
The XFL used a standard form contract paying $2,725 per week for each player on the active roster, $1,040 of which is guaranteed. A $2,222 victory bonus is paid to the players on each game's winning team; this feature is a carryover from the original XFL. The contracts expire at the end of the season, freeing players to sign with any other league. Players are also paid $1,040 per week during the preseason and through the playoffs if their team does not qualify. Starting quarterbacks make an annual salary of up to $495,000, with the average XFL quarterback earning $125,000. In contrast to the original XFL, players' health insurance is covered by the league.

Plans were for the league to offer contracts between one and three years in length. Signing for a longer term would make the player eligible for a loyalty bonus above and beyond their tiered salary; in return, the player would not be allowed to play in any other league during the spring, summer, or autumn months, nor is the contract guaranteed. The overall salary cap will be approximately $4,000,000 per team. The XFL chose a more flexible salary structure so as not to overpay for the lower ends of the roster and to be more competitive for better starting quarterbacks.

Head coaches were eligible for up to a $500,000 salary, with each team having a football operations staff of 25 people.

Player movementOn March 10, each team's maximum roster size increased from 52 to 57 players and the majority of Team 9 was dispersed. Team 9 was to reload to approximately 36 players. 

 Notable Players 

 Connor Cook
 Lance Dunbar
 Michael Dunn
 Kony Ealy
 DeMarquis Gates
 S.J. Green
 Taylor Heinicke
 Will Hill III
 Godwin Igwebuike
 Tyree Jackson
 Josh Johnson
 Steven Johnson
 Cardale Jones
 Landry Jones
 Matt Jones
 Marquette King
 Christian Kuntz
 Matt McGloin
 Christine Michael
 Nick Moore
 Rahim Moore
 Aaron Murray
 Storm Norton
 Nick Novak
 Shawn Oakman
 Donald Parham
 Cam Phillips
 Eli Rogers
 Jordan Ta'amu
 P.J. Walker

Season structure
Preseason
Minicamps were held at each team's discretion in December 2019. The Wildcats hosted their minicamp at the University of Nevada, Las Vegas while the Renegades hosted theirs at Arlington High School. The Vipers hosted their minicamp at the renovated Plant City Stadium, which also served as the team's headquarters and practice venue during the season.

The XFL held its training camps in Houston, Texas, from January 4–22, 2020. Each team trained at a different stadium in the city, with the hometown Houston Roughnecks using their game stadium, TDECU Stadium. The other seven were as follows:

Dallas Renegades: Darrell Tully Stadium
DC Defenders: Rice Stadium
LA Wildcats: Alexander Durley Sports Complex
New York Guardians: Husky Stadium
St. Louis BattleHawks: W.W. Thorne Stadium
Seattle Dragons: Delmar Stadium
Tampa Bay Vipers: George Turner Stadium

The eight teams held informal scrimmages against each other. The league did not initially plan to host exhibition games, but the television networks requested preseason matchups in order to conduct trial runs for their broadcasts. These were held during the day midweek in late January and were closed to the public.

Regular season
The league is divided into two divisions, East and West. Each team was given a ten-game schedule with no bye weeks, playing two games against each division rival (one home and one away) and one game against each team in the other division.

Cancellation
As the COVID-19 pandemic began to escalate in major American cities, there were concerns in regards to the spread of COVID-19. On March 11, the state of Washington imposed social distancing measures prohibiting the gathering of 250 or more persons. The league initially stated that a Seattle Dragons game against Los Angeles would be held behind closed doors as scheduled. McMahon was planning on defying a similar guideline issued by New Jersey and going ahead with a game between the Houston Roughnecks and New York Guardians at MetLife Stadium with a full crowd, as New Jersey governor Phil Murphy had not made those guidelines mandatory at the time and the league was expecting a large attendance. After the National Basketball Association suspended all games after two players tested positive of the virus, further social distancing measures were announced elsewhere and an unnamed Dragons player developed symptoms of the virus (he later tested positive). The next day, the XFL announced it too canceled the remainder of their regular season.

Playoffs
The playoffs were to feature four teams, two from each division. In contrast to the 2001 XFL (which used a crossover approach in which teams faced the opposite division), the 2020 XFL would feature two division games, with the top two teams in each division facing off against each other to determine who represents the division in the XFL Championship.

On February 13, 2020, the XFL formally announced that the name of the game would be the "XFL Championship" (reviving the alternate title of the first XFL Championship, which was also known as the Million Dollar Game) and would be held at TDECU Stadium in Houston, Texas. The league initially had hoped that the social distancing measures would expire later in the season to allow the championship to be held. Any hope of resuming the season ended on April 10 with the league terminating almost all of its remaining employees and suspending operations.

 Standings 

 Season schedule 

 Regular season 

Canceled games

 Playoffs 
The playoffs were supposed to start on April 18 and end the championship on April 26. But due to COVID 19 This XFL couldn’t complete the regular season and the postseason.

Attendance
Announced attendance figures for each home game. In the weekly columns, dashes (—) indicate away games, while bold font indicates the highest attendance of each team.

 Star of the Week 
The Star of the Week is a weekly award given out by the XFL. The XFL selects eight nominees (one from each team) based on who they feel had the best performance, or the performance that had the most impact, of that week in XFL play and the public votes on their choice. The two winners from Saturday and Sunday's polls go against each other, and once again the public votes for the winner. 

 Midseason awards 
The midseason awards are given out by the XFL at the end of Week 5. These awards are given out first by the league selecting four nominees, and the public votes on who should win. The XFL also selected a mid-season All-XFL Team for the best players at each position.

The Houston Roughnecks had the most number of players on the All-XFL midseason team with 6, with the St. Louis BattleHawks and Dallas Renegades tied for second at four players. The Tampa Bay Vipers had three, and the other four teams with two each.

 Statistical leaders 

League finances
On December 15, 2017, Bleacher Report columnist Brad Shepard reported that McMahon was seriously considering a revival of the XFL, with an expected announcement on January 25, 2018. In a statement to Deadspin, WWE did not confirm or deny the rumors, but did state that McMahon was establishing a new company known as Alpha Entertainment, which would "explore investment opportunities across the sports and entertainment landscapes, including professional football." On December 21, 2017, WWE issued a filing to the Securities and Exchange Commission, stating that McMahon had sold $100 million worth of WWE stock to fund Alpha Entertainment. Alpha Entertainment was headquartered next door to WWE headquarters in Stamford, Connecticut.

On January 25, 2018, Alpha Entertainment announced a new incarnation of the XFL, which would begin with a 10-week inaugural season beginning in January or February 2020.  McMahon stated that the league would feature eight teams as a single entity owned by Alpha (the previous XFL was also a single-entity league), which had been revealed in 2019. Alpha Entertainment was established to keep the league's management and operations separate from that of WWE. McMahon is prepared to invest as much as $500 million, five times as much as his investment in the 2001 XFL. He liquidated an additional $270 million in WWE stock (representing a 4% stake in WWE) in March 2019 to provide additional funding for the league.

Partnerships

The XFL ran test games with community colleges in Mississippi, Your Call Football (YCF), and The Spring League (TSL) during their spring 2019 seasons, to experiment with rule changes. The XFL even had a preliminary discussions with TSL about their league becoming the an "Official 'D-League' of the XFL".

Gambling
In February 2020, the XFL announced that DraftKings would be the official daily fantasy sports provider of the league and an "authorized gaming operator". McMahon has a minority investment in the company.

Luck stated he anticipated mobile sports betting to be legal in many states by the 2020 launch date, much like it is in New Jersey, and hoped to integrate legal sports betting as part of the XFL. Every state hosting an XFL team, except Florida which has an existing law banning sports betting, has either introduced or passed legislation for the legalization of sports betting. "California also has a pending voter referendum that could legalize sports betting." In December 2019, Luck stated he was cooperating with the Las Vegas sportsbooks in providing official information for betting purposes.

The XFL's main broadcast partner has an official partnership with gambling operators, with ESPN partnered with Caesars Entertainment to use its sportsbook information during telecasts (including displaying lines and the over/under directly on the score bug in-game).

The XFL also has an in-house gaming app service called PlayXFL where fans can win cash prizes for correctly predicting the exact score of select XFL games each week. Additionally, fans attending an XFL game can opt-in to play a 4-Question Pick'em contest about the game they are attending for the chance to win prizes, including merchandise and tickets, from the applicable home team.

Broadcasting
This was the first year (and the only year of the contract due to no season games in 2021 or 2022) of a three-year agreement with ESPN and Fox Sports to carry all 43 regular season and playoff games.

During the regular season, ABC was scheduled to air ten Saturday games, five of them ended up being televised, and four Sunday games, airing only one of the four Sunday games. ESPN was to air five Sunday games, airing only two of them, and ESPN2 was to air two Sunday games, airing only one of the two. Fox was to air seven Saturday games, five of the seven being televised, one Sunday game, which was televised, and two Thursday games, neither being played. Fox's main cable sports network, FS1, was to air nine Sunday games, with only four being played, and FS2 was to air one Saturday game, which was not played. ESPN and Fox were both scheduled to air one semifinal each, and ESPN was to air the championship game. All three never made the air.

Vegas Stats & Information Network produced supplemental "BetCasts" for iHeartRadio for two games each week, which featured commentary from a sports betting perspective.

ViewershipIn millions of viewers''

One decimal place is shown in table but three decimal places are used in all calculations.

Audio and radio coverage

Signees to other professional leagues
After the XFL season was cut short on March 12, 2020, players were allowed to sign with National Football League (NFL) or Canadian Football League (CFL) teams beginning on March 22.

NFL signings
The following players signed with NFL teams:

St. Louis BattleHawks safety Kenny Robinson was drafted by the Carolina Panthers in the fifth round of the 2020 NFL Draft, as the only NFL Draft-eligible player who played in the XFL in 2020.

CFL signings
The following players signed with CFL teams:

References

2020 XFL season
XFL (2020)
XFL season